The 2015 season was the Carolina Panthers' 21st in the National Football League (NFL) and their fifth under head coach Ron Rivera. This season marked the first time in team history they played on Thanksgiving. The Panthers had their best single-season turnaround in team history, going from 7-8-1 to 15-1.

Despite waiving longtime running back and franchise rushing leader DeAngelo Williams and losing top wide receiver Kelvin Benjamin to a torn ACL in the preseason, the Panthers had their best regular season in franchise history and one of the best regular seasons in NFL history. The Panthers joined the 1984 San Francisco 49ers, 1985 Chicago Bears (for whom Rivera played as a linebacker), 1998 Minnesota Vikings, 2004 Pittsburgh Steelers, 2007 New England Patriots (who were a perfect 16–0 in the regular season) and the 2011 Green Bay Packers as the only teams to accomplish this feat.

Carolina started the season 14–0, not only setting franchise records for the best start and the longest single-season winning streak, but also posting the best start to a season by an NFC team since the NFL–AFL merger, breaking the 13–0 record previously shared with the 2009 New Orleans Saints and the aforementioned 2011 Packers. They joined the 1972 Miami Dolphins, 2007 Patriots and 2009 Indianapolis Colts, all from the AFC, as the only teams to reach 14–0. Carolina clinched their third straight NFC South title on December 6, when the Atlanta Falcons lost earlier that day, becoming the first team to clinch a playoff berth that season, and giving the Panthers a home playoff game for the third consecutive year.

The Panthers' undefeated streak came to an end at the hands of the Falcons in a Week 16 rematch. A week later, however, Carolina routed the Tampa Bay Buccaneers to finish 15–1, giving the Panthers home-field advantage throughout the NFC playoffs for the first time in franchise history. The Panthers had the league's top offense, and quarterback Cam Newton was named the NFL Most Valuable Player (MVP).

In the playoffs, the Panthers defeated the Seattle Seahawks 31–24 in the divisional round, avenging their elimination at the hands of the Seahawks from the previous season. The Panthers then blew out the Arizona Cardinals in the NFC Championship game by a score of 49–15 to reach their second Super Bowl appearance in franchise history. In the NFL's title game, the Panthers lost to the Denver Broncos in Super Bowl 50 by a score of 24–10, thus becoming the fifth straight team to have at least 15 victories and not win the Super Bowl.

Draft

Note: The Panthers did not have selections in the third, sixth or seventh rounds as a result of the following trades:
 Trading their second-, third- and sixth- round selections (Nos. 57, 89 and 201 overall, respectively) to the St. Louis Rams in exchange for the Rams' second-round selection (No. 41 overall);
 Trading their fourth-, fifth- and seventh-round selections (Nos. 124, 161 and 242 overall, respectively) to the Oakland Raiders in exchange for the Raiders' fourth-round selection (No. 102 overall).

Staff

Final roster

Criticism
Throughout the offseason, regular season, and postseason, the 2015–16 Carolina Panthers were subjected to large amounts of criticism from the national media. One of the earliest criticisms, continuing from the previous season, concerned the team's apparent lack of good wide receivers. NBC Sports analyst Rodney Harrison, a former Super Bowl-winning safety, in particular criticized the Panthers throughout the season for what he believed to be a lack of good wide receivers although he acknowledged he did not hate the team as a whole. A major criticism-turned media story during the year was the 'Tennessee Mom letter', where a Tennessee mother wrote to Cam Newton after being offended at his dancing during a week 10 victory against the Titans. She later wrote an apology via The Charlotte Observer days after publishing the original letter online.

One of the longest-lasting criticisms was the 'worst undefeated team' statement, where week after week media outlets called the Panthers the worst undefeated team ever, even while Carolina blew out its opponents. Another long-lasting criticism was the amount of NFL experts and analysts from various sports outlets picking against the Panthers. This was especially true leading up to the playoff games against Seattle and Arizona, despite Carolina's superior regular season record and undefeated record at home.

After Super Bowl 50, Newton again came under criticism for his actions during his post-game press conference. In about a five-minute span, he answered few questions and abruptly walked out without saying why. The national media debated both sides of the issue in the following days, with people coming to Newton's defense and trying to figure out the reason behind why Newton left. Newton later offered an explanation during the team's locker clean-out day where he stated the Panthers would return to the Super Bowl.

Schedule

Preseason

Regular season

Note: Intra-division opponents are in bold text.

Postseason

Game summaries

Regular season

Week 1: at Jacksonville Jaguars

Panthers CB Josh Norman intercepted one of Blake Bortles' passes, returning it for a touchdown and WR Jericho Cotchery caught the first Panthers offensive TD of the year as Carolina started the 2015 season 1–0. However, linebacker Luke Kuechly sustained a concussion during the game and would be out for the next three weeks.

Week 2: vs. Houston Texans

Carolina's home opener was highlighted by QB Cam Newton's flip into the end zone in the 3rd quarter. Despite the athletic move, the team still had to endure a final Houston drive to ensure the victory. With the win, the Panthers improved to 2–0.

Week 3: vs. New Orleans Saints

In a close contest the Saints, with backup QB Luke McCown starting in place of an injured Drew Brees, almost stole the victory. McCown threw for over 300 yards as the score went back and forth. On the Saints last drive, McCown's 4th quarter end zone heave was intercepted by Josh Norman, sealing the win for Carolina. With the victory, the Panthers improved to 3–0.

Week 4: at Tampa Bay Buccaneers
{{Americanfootballbox
 |titlestyle=; border:2px solid black;text-align:center;
 |state=autocollapse
 |title=Week Four: Carolina Panthers at Tampa Bay Buccaneers – Game summary
 |date=October 4
 |time=1:00 pm. EDT
 |road=Panthers
 |R1=10|R2=7|R3=14|R4=6
 |home=Buccaneers
 |H1=3|H2=7|H3=7|H4=6
 |stadium=Raymond James Stadium, Tampa, Florida
 |attendance=57,468
 |weather=, cloudy
 |referee=Gene Steratore
 |TV=Fox
 |TVAnnouncers=Chris Myers, Ronde Barber and Jennifer Hale
 |reference=Recap, Gamebook
 |scoring=
First quarter
 CAR – Graham Gano 24-yard field goal, 12:09.  Panthers 3–0.  Drive: 5 plays, 15 yards, 2:12.
 CAR – Josh Norman 46-yard interception return, (Graham Gano kick), 10:41.  Panthers 10–0.  Drive: 3 plays, 2 yards, 1:28.'' TB – Kyle Brindza 42-yard field goal, 7:03.  Panthers 10–3.  Drive: 7 plays, 39 yards, 3:38.Second quarter CAR – Ted Ginn Jr. 6-yard pass from Cam Newton, (Graham Gano kick), 10:50.  Panthers 17–3.  Drive: 8 plays, 45 yards, 3:24.
 TB – Doug Martin 5-yard run, (Kyle Brindza kick), 4:23.  Panthers 17–10.  Drive: 13 plays, 80 yards, 6:27.Third quarter CAR – Ed Dickson 57-yard fumble recovery, (Graham Gano kick), 12:25.  Panthers 24–10.  Drive: 1 play, 67 yards, 0:13.
 CAR – Ted Ginn Jr. 12-yard pass from Cam Newton, (Graham Gano kick), 7:25.  Panthers 31–10.  Drive: 5 plays, 33 yards, 2:25.
 TB – Charles Sims 10-yard pass from Jameis Winston, (Kyle Brindza kick), 2:48.  Panthers 31–17.  Drive: 8 plays, 80 yards, 4:37.Fourth quarter CAR – Graham Gano 27-yard field goal, 13:28.  Panthers 34–17.  Drive: 8 plays, 60 yards, 4:20.
 CAR – Graham Gano 27-yard field goal, 4:15.  Panthers 37–17.  Drive: 6 plays, 20 yards, 2:41.
 TB – Vincent Jackson 6-yard pass from Jameis Winston, (kick failed), 0:58.  Panthers 37–23.  Drive: 11 plays, 81 yards, 3:17.
 |stats=Top passers CAR – Cam Newton - 11/22, 124 yards, 2 TD
 TB – Jameis Winston - 26/43, 287 yards, 2 TD, 4 INTTop rushers CAR – Cam Newton - 12 rushes, 51 yards
 TB – Doug Martin - 20 rushes, 106 yardsTop receivers CAR – Brenton Bersin - 4 rec, 54 yards
 TB – Vincent Jackson - 10 rec, 147 yardsTop tacklers CAR – Thomas Davis - 11 tackles
 TB – Chris Conte - 8 tackles
}}
Josh Norman had his second pick-six of the season and Tampa Bay QB Jameis Winston threw 4 interceptions, with Norman intercepting a second one later in the game. On the game's most bizarre play, the ball was stripped from RB Jonathan Stewart by a Tampa defender; the ball flew up in the air and TE Ed Dickson, who'd been trailing the play, grabbed it and ran untouched into the end zone. With the victory, the Panthers improved to 4–0. Carolina also became one of five teams to finish the first quarter of the season undefeated overall, and one of three NFC teams to do so.

Week 6: at Seattle Seahawks

After a bye week the Panthers flew to Washington state for their fifth meeting with the Seattle Seahawks in the Rivera/Newton era; the past four meetings were all close, low-scoring games won by Seattle. Challenges started early on game day for the Panthers, as a fire alarm was pulled at 5:40 am at their hotel. Mere hours later, in front of a capacity crowd at CenturyLink Field, Carolina overcame a slow first three-quarters, including giving up a reverse flea flicker TD pass, to stun the Seahawks in the 4th. After coming back from a 14-point deficit (down 20–7 at one point), Carolina's defense managed to stop Seattle's offense. With just over two minutes to play Cam Newton led the offense down the field 80 yards (the fourth time he'd done so in the game) down 23–20. The drive concluded at around half a minute to play, when Newton found TE Greg Olsen wide open in the end zone for the go-ahead touchdown. Carolina's defense stuffed Seattle's last offensive possession, ending the game. With the surprising win, the Panthers improved to 5–0, their first such start since 2003. It was also in this game that Cam Newton debuted the 'dab' touchdown dance after a rushing TD, which was quickly imitated by other players around the NFL and in college football.

Week 7: vs. Philadelphia Eagles

Carolina pulled out the pregame fireworks for their team introduction. Newton threw and ran for scores and fullback Mike Tolbert was responsible for two touchdowns. With yet another close win, this one coming down to a failed Eagles 4th-down conversion, the Panthers went 6-0 for the first time in franchise history. It also marked their first home victory on Sunday Night Football since 2009.

Week 8: vs. Indianapolis Colts

The Panthers came into the Monday night game as one of four undefeated teams in the NFL, while playing their second game in eight days. The team took to the field amid fireworks, as is their custom for prime-time contests. A heavy rain kept up most of the night, which saw both the drenched crowd of over 74,000 stay in their seats and a 23-6 Panther lead dissolve by a 17-point Colts comeback in the 4th. Indianapolis sent the game into overtime with a field goal following a near-pick by Kuechly; the extra period began close to midnight. Each team managed a field goal on their first two possessions. Carolina got a break when Colts QB Andrew Luck threw his third interception, which was picked off by Kuechly on the game's 154th play, according to ESPN play-by-play man Mike Tirico. A few plays later, Panthers kicker Graham Gano hit a 52-yard field goal, his longest of the season, to give Carolina the win early Tuesday morning. With the win, the Panthers went 7-0 for the first time in franchise history. Also, Carolina became the last undefeated team in the NFC with the Packers' loss to the Broncos the previous night on Sunday Night Football.

Week 9: vs. Green Bay Packers

Green Bay came into Charlotte looking for a much-needed victory after their loss to Denver. The game was a 27-7 Panthers blowout in the first half, but came down to the wire as the Packers mounted a 4th quarter comeback, answered only by a single Panthers offensive TD. The last few minutes saw the Packers drive deep into Panthers territory, looking to get a touchdown and a game-tying two-point conversion. However, LB Thomas Davis intercepted an Aaron Rodgers pass on 4th down inside the red zone, ensuring the win for Carolina. With the close win the Panthers improved to 8-0 for the first time in franchise history. They were one of three teams to finish the first half of the season undefeated.

Week 10: at Tennessee Titans

The Panthers' hot streak continued as they went 9-0 for the first time in franchise history, eclipsing the eight-game win streak during the 2013 season. Carolina also won its first game against the Titans ever since they relocated to Tennessee. After the Cincinnati Bengals lost on Monday Night Football the next night, Carolina was one of 2 undefeateds left in the NFL, with the other being New England.

Week 11: vs. Washington Redskins

In a game marred with a high number of penalty flags, Carolina overcame a close 1st quarter to roll over Washington for the remainder of the game. Cam Newton tied the franchise record of five touchdown passes in one game. Most of the flags were against Washington's defense, including at least five neutral zone infraction penalties, where a defensive player crosses the imaginary line separating them and the offensive line. The Panthers' winning streak continued as they went 10–0 for the first time in franchise history.

Week 12: at Dallas CowboysThanksgiving Day game'''

In their first Thanksgiving Day game, the Panthers debuted their all-Panther blue Nike "Color Rush" uniforms while the Cowboys debuted all white. The Panthers intercepted three passes from Dallas QB Tony Romo, the first one less than a minute into the game by DB Kurt Coleman, who returned it for a touchdown. Kuechly had his first pick-six of his career minutes later, and on the Cowboys' next offensive series, managed to intercept Romo yet again. Romo was later injured by a sack from Panthers LB Thomas Davis at the end of the third quarter and would leave the game, being replaced by Matt Cassel. He would end up missing the rest of the 2015 season.

With the blowout win, the Panthers improved to 11–0. With the New England Patriots' overtime loss to the Denver Broncos on November 29 during Sunday Night Football, the Panthers became the last undefeated team in the NFL, and would remain so for the following month.

Week 13: at New Orleans Saints

Due to the Falcons' loss to the Buccaneers earlier that same day, the Panthers entered this game having already clinched their third straight NFC South title—becoming the first team in the 2015 season to clinch a playoff berth, as well as the first team to clinch their division that season. Led by Drew Brees and a determined defense, New Orleans fought hard all game, their defense recovering three Panthers turnovers- including the first returned extra point attempt for points in NFL history. In the end, Carolina needed a 4th quarter game-winning touchdown drive from the offense (including a 4th down conversion), and a last-second defensive stand to seal it. With the thrilling win, the Panthers became the 9th team in NFL history to start the season 12–0. They also matched their franchise record for most victories in a season.

Week 14: vs. Atlanta Falcons

The Panthers shut out Atlanta 38–0 to move to 13–0. Carolina's defense recorded five sacks and four turnovers- two fumbles and two interceptions- and held Atlanta to 54 total yards rushing. Perhaps the most impressive play of the game was Newton's touchdown pass to Ed Dickson, where Newton managed to fit the ball between multiple defenders' hands and into Dickson's grasp. The victory assured the Panthers of no worse than the second seed in the NFC—and with it, a first-round bye in the NFC playoffs. However, the Cardinals' win over the Vikings three days earlier prevented them from also clinching home-field advantage throughout the playoffs. Carolina additionally broke the franchise record of most games won in a regular season (12 games) that had been set in 1996, 2008, and 2013, respectively.

Week 15: at New York Giants

The Panthers looked to stay hot and undefeated as they traveled to MetLife Stadium to take on the Giants, led by two-time Super Bowl winning QB Eli Manning and star WR Odell Beckham Jr., who both had strong performances in a Monday Night shootout at Miami a week earlier. Much of the game was overshadowed by Beckham's and Josh Norman's melees throughout the game, which would lead to Beckham being suspended the following week and both players receiving fines. Carolina led 35-7 late in the third quarter, but the Manning-led Giants stormed back with four touchdowns (the last of which was a pass to Beckham) to tie the game with just under two minutes remaining.  Carolina responded by putting together a quick drive that concluded with a game-winning field goal on the final play of regulation. With the last-second win, the Panthers moved to 14-0 and set a new record for the most wins to start a season by an NFC team. It also made them the fourth team, along with the 1972 Miami Dolphins, the 2007 New England Patriots, and the 2009 Indianapolis Colts to start a season 14–0 in NFL history.

Week 16: at Atlanta Falcons

The Panthers' undefeated season came to an end with a 13–20 loss in Atlanta, dropping their record to 14–1. Carolina started off well with a Newton rushing TD, but Atlanta proved to be too much at home, culminating in a long touchdown pass from Falcons QB Matt Ryan to WR Julio Jones. The Falcons defense swarmed the field all day, as the Panthers couldn't manage a touchdown for the rest of the game. As a result, Atlanta pulled off the upset. Despite the loss, their only one of the regular season, Carolina kept both its playoff spot and division title. It was also the Panthers' first regular season loss since November 30, 2014, when they were beaten 13-31 by the Minnesota Vikings.

Week 17: vs. Tampa Bay Buccaneers

The Panthers entered the day needing either a win against the Buccaneers, or an Arizona Cardinals loss to the Seahawks to secure the top seed in the NFC. Cam Newton tied former 49ers QB Steve Young for 43 career rushing touchdowns, the defense forced two interceptions from Bucs QB Jameis Winston and versatile special teams player Joe Webb (who also played backup QB and WR) recovered a fumbled punt return by Buccaneers RB Bobby Rainey. The Panthers capped off their best season in franchise history with a dominating win over Tampa Bay, finishing the regular season with a 15–1 record. It was both the most regular season wins ever recorded in franchise history and the best record in the NFL that year. With the win, the Panthers clinched home-field advantage throughout the NFC playoffs for the first time in franchise history, although the Cardinals' simultaneous loss to the Seahawks would've allowed Carolina to remain as the #1 seed either way.

Postseason

NFC Divisional Playoffs: vs. (6) Seattle Seahawks

This playoff game was a rematch of 2014's divisional round game and the second meeting between the Panthers and Seahawks during the 2015–16 season. Tickets were sold out in under five minutes and all Panthers fans in attendance were given white towels to twirl, matching Carolina's all-white uniforms.

Carolina raced to a 31–0 halftime lead due to strong play on both sides of the ball, including a Kuechly pick-six. A couple of the Panthers' biggest offensive plays of the half were a long run by Jonathan Stewart to start the game and TE Greg Olsen's touchdown catch that was made with a defenders' arm in between Olsen's. The huge lead was only temporary, however, as the Seahawks scored 24 unanswered points in the second half and were a touchdown away from tying the game. The victory wasn't sealed for sure until Thomas Davis recovered an onside kick with 1:12 to play in regulation. The Panthers advanced to their fourth NFC Championship game in franchise history, their first NFC Championship appearance since 2005 and the first to be played at Bank of America Stadium.

NFC Championship: vs. (2) Arizona Cardinals

Bank of America Stadium was open earlier than usual due to the recent winter weather around the region, allowing some fans to see the ending of the AFC Championship game, since it was broadcast on the stadium's video boards.

Less than four hours later, with another sold-out crowd mostly wearing a mix of black and blue, the Carolina Panthers routed the Arizona Cardinals by a score of 49–15 en route to Super Bowl 50. The Panthers forced seven turnovers from the Cardinals, six from QB Carson Palmer and one from cornerback Patrick Peterson on a punt return, despite losing Thomas Davis to an arm injury early. Offensively, Cam Newton threw two touchdown passes and ran for another pair. Linebacker Luke Kuechly had both his third pick-six of the year and pick-sixes in consecutive playoff games, while safety Kurt Coleman had two red zone interceptions. Coleman's first pick came the play after Peterson picked off a Newton pass. The Panthers also out gained the Cardinals in total yardage 476–287.
In the aftermath of Kuechly's pick-six, with the victory fully secured, the stadium itself began shaking due to the crowd noise and energy. This was noticed on air by Fox Sports' Joe Buck, who, after the cameras showed almost thirty seconds of exuberant Panthers fans dancing in the stands, stated: "This booth is literally bouncing."

With the blowout win, the Panthers would improve to 17–1 overall and would head onto the Super Bowl, their first appearance in twelve years and their second in franchise history. They would become the first 15–1 team to do so since the 1985 Bears. The win also made Rivera the fifth minority and the second Latino head coach to lead a team to the Super Bowl, the first being Tom Flores who'd lead the Raiders to Super Bowl XVIII. Coincidentally, Rivera was a linebacker for the Chicago Bears when they won Super Bowl XX.

Super Bowl 50: vs. (A1) Denver Broncos

Despite out gaining the Broncos 315-194 and having 21 first downs compared to Denver's 11, Carolina lost to Denver in Super Bowl 50. Carolina's defense played well, allowing only one offensive touchdown, which was aided by a Panthers' turnover in the red zone. Carolina ultimately committed 4 costly turnovers though, including two strip sacks from QB Cam Newton, one of which immediately resulted in a touchdown for the Denver Broncos. Newton finished the game completing 18 of 41 passes for 265 yards with one interception, rushed six times for 45 yards and was sacked a career-high nine times. The Carolina Panthers finished with a 17–2 overall record.

Standings

Division

Conference

References

External links
 

Carolina
Carolina Panthers seasons
Carolina Panthers
NFC South championship seasons
National Football Conference championship seasons